Tuanku Syed Putra Stadium or Stadium Utama Kangar is a multi-purpose stadium in Kangar, Perlis, Malaysia. It is currently used mostly for association football matches. The stadium holds 20,000 people and opened in 1995.

See also
 Sport in Malaysia

Football venues in Malaysia
Kangar
Buildings and structures in Perlis
Athletics (track and field) venues in Malaysia
Multi-purpose stadiums in Malaysia
Sport in Perlis
1995 establishments in Malaysia